Pechea is a commune in Galați County, Western Moldavia, Romania with a population of 11,199 people. It is composed of two villages, Lupele and Pechea.

Natives
 Lucian Bute
 Steluța Luca 
 Costică Silion

External links

Pechea Galati

References

Communes in Galați County
Localities in Western Moldavia